Warnborough may refer to the following places in England:

 Warnborough College, Canterbury (previously in Oxford)
 Warnborough Green, Hampshire
 Warnborough Road, Oxford
 North Warnborough, Hampshire
 South Warnborough, Hampshire

See also
 Wanborough (disambiguation)